Liberalism in Australia dates back to the earliest Australian pioneers and has maintained a strong foothold to this day. Liberalism in the country is primarily represented by the centre-right Liberal Party. The Liberal Party is a fusion of liberal and conservative forces and are affiliated with the conservative centre-right International Democrat Union. Philosophical liberals are often called a "small-l liberal" to distinguish them from conservative members of the Liberal Party.

Introduction
Some of the earliest pioneers of the federation movement, men such as Alfred Deakin, came under the influence of David Syme of The Age. Other influencers  of federalism included Samuel Griffith who, while initially seen as a supporter of the labour movement, became partisan against the Labour movement with his legal intervention in the 1891 Australian Shearers' strike. While all of these men were generally self-described "liberals", their understanding of liberalism differed substantially. At the time, Deakin was sometimes described as a "radical", and was disliked by both urban conservatives, and the squatting class of Australia. (However, Deakin was also consistently opposed to Labor, instrumental in the fusion of the centre-right parties, a strong supporter of the White Australia policy, and a prominent proponent of stronger trade and defence ties to the British Empire – a position that gained him admirers amongst tories in the UK.) The degree of progressive sentiments also varied from colony to colony: social liberals such as David Syme were prominent in Victoria while others were prominent in South Australia, for instance. At any rate, Australia's parliamentary institutions, especially at a national level, were brand-new, so it was difficult for anyone to be labelled "conservative" in a traditional sense.  The two largest political parties, the Free Trade Party and the Protectionist Party, could both loosely be described as "liberal" in the terms of the time. They were moderates with a strong belief in parliamentary institutions, financially orthodox and attached to the British Empire, with a distaste for radicalism. The third major political force was the trade union movement represented by the Australian Labor Party. The rise in popularity of the Labor Party became the major preoccupation of these two other parties.

In the early stages of the parliament, the Labor Party engaged in a partnership with the more radical Protectionists, but Labor's wide-ranging policies for social reform met with only lukewarm support from most Protectionists. Fear of socialism became widespread among the ranks  of the establishment, and as the question of tariffs was settled, there was increasing pressure on the non-Labor parliamentary forces to unite in opposition to Labor.

The result was the Fusion in 1909, composed of Joseph Cook's Anti-Socialist Party (formerly Free Trade Party), and conservative Protectionists. The Fusion soon began calling itself the Liberal Party, proclaiming its adherence to classical liberalism.  After Deakin's departure, the fervent anti-socialist Joseph Cook became leader of the party and it became the dominant right-wing force in Australian politics.

The pattern of a non-Labor party defining itself as liberal rather than conservative and deriving support from a middle-class base continued to the formation of the present-day Liberal Party, founded in 1945 and led initially by Sir Robert Menzies. Malcolm Fraser, quoting from Menzies' memoir, Afternoon Light, described the decision to call the party "Liberal" in these terms, We chose the word 'Liberal' because we want to be a progressive party, in no way conservative, in no way reactionary.
However, previous Liberal Prime Minister, John Howard, is reported to have described himself the most conservative leader the Liberal Party had ever had.

The "wet" (moderate) and "dry" (conservative) wings of the Liberal party co-operated fairly harmoniously, but in the early 1970s as conservatives started to dominate in South Australia liberals led by Steele Hall broke off to form the Liberal Movement.  In 1977, other dissident 'small-l liberal' forces led by Don Chipp created the Australian Democrats.

Contemporary Australian liberalism

From the early 1990s, social conservatism has characterised the Liberal Party's actions in Government and policy development. Former Prime Minister John Howard in a 2005 speech described the modern position:
The Liberal Party is a broad church. You sometimes have to get the builders in to put in the extra pew on both sides of the aisle to make sure that everybody is accommodated. But it is a broad church and we should never as members of the Liberal Party of Australia lose sight of the fact that we are the trustees of two great political traditions. We are, of course, the custodian of the classical liberal tradition within our society, Australian Liberals should revere the contribution of John Stuart Mill to political thought. We are also the custodians of the conservative tradition in our community. And if you look at the history of the Liberal Party it is at its best when it balances and blends those two traditions. Mill and Burke are interwoven into the history and the practice and the experience of our political party.

Federal "small-l liberals", such as Joe Hockey  and Malcolm Turnbull were Cabinet ministers in the Howard government. Christopher Pyne , George Brandis  and Bruce Billson served in the outer ministry. In 2018, members of this grouping made up the substantial majority of senior cabinet and ministry positions in the government of small-l liberal Turnbull. At the state level, "small-l liberals" have substantial influence particularly in New South Wales, Victoria, South Australia and Tasmania.

The Democrats, fractured under the leadership of Cheryl Kernot and Natasha Stott Despoja, moved to the left. Party leader Meg Lees formed the more avowedly centrist Australian Progressive Alliance in 2003.  In 2002, Tasmanian Liberal candidate Greg Barns was disendorsed following comments opposing Government action taken over the Tampa affair. Barns joined the Australian Democrats, with the view of returning a strong liberal platform to the party.

Timeline

From Protectionist Party and Free Trade Party to (Commonwealth) Liberal Party
1880s: The Protectionist Party and Free Trade Party are formed.
1906: The Free Trade Party is renamed the Anti-Socialist Party.
1908: The Protectionists and Anti-Socialists merge into the Commonwealth Liberal Party (The Fusion).

From Commonwealth Liberal Party and ALP dissidents to Nationalist Party of Australia
1916: The Australian Labor Party (ALP) expels Billy Hughes and others. They form the National Labor Party
1917: The National Labor Party merges with the Commonwealth Liberal Party to form the Nationalist Party of Australia.

From Nationalist Party of Australia and ALP dissidents to Liberal Party of Australia
1929: Billy Hughes and others are expelled from the Nationalist Party of Australia. In 1930 they form the Australian Party.
1932: The Nationalist Party joins with the Australian Party and several ALP dissidents led by Joseph Lyons to form the United Australia Party.
1944: The United Australia Party merges with the Australian Women's National League and several other groups to form the Liberal Party of Australia.

From Australian Women's National League to Liberal Party of Australia
1904: The Australian Women's National League is founded.
1945: The Australian Women's National League becomes part of the Liberal Party.

From state farmers' parties to National Party of Australia
Early 1900s: State farming organisations form, including Victorian Farmers Union and Farmers and Settlers Association of Western Australia.
1913: Country Party founded by the WA organisation.
1917-1919: Other state farmers' parties form in Queensland, Victoria, South Australia and NSW.
1920: These farmers parties join and form the Australian Country Party.
1932: South Australian branch merges with the Liberal Federation to become the Liberal and Country League.
1963: The Country Party's South Australian branch splits, the LCL losing Country Party affiliation.
1974: NT branch disaffiliates and merges with the NT branch of the Liberal Party of Australia (Liberals) to form the Country Liberal Party
1975: Country Party changes name to National Country Party (NCP).
1979: Country Liberal Party affiliates with NCP (also with the Liberals).
1982: NCP changes name to National Party of Australia (NPA).

From Australian Liberal Union to Liberal Party of Australia in South Australia
?: Australian Liberal Union (ALU)
?: ALU affiliates with the Free Trade Party (later known as the Anti-Socialist Party)
1908: ALU affiliates with the Commonwealth Liberal Party as the Anti-Socialist Party merges to form it.
1917: Liberal Federation formed by merging the South Australian Liberal Union with the SA part of the new Nationalist Party of Australia. The Federation affiliates with the Nationalists.
1932: The Liberal Federation merges with the South Australian branch of the Country Party to form the Liberal and Country League (LCL).
?: The LCL affiliates with the Country Party.
?: The LCL affiliates with the United Australia Party (UAP).
1944: The LCL loses UAP affiliation with its end, and takes up affiliation with its successor the Liberal Party of Australia.
1963: The Country Party's South Australian branch splits, the LCL losing Country Party affiliation.
1974: LCL renames to Liberal Party of Australia (South Australian Division).

From Liberal Party of Australia dissidents to Australian Democrats
1966: The Liberal Reform Group seceded from the conservative Liberal Party of Australia.
1969: The Group is renamed Liberal Reform Movement, then Australia Party later that year.
1973: The Liberal Movement secedes from the Liberal and Country League in South Australia.
1976: The Liberal Movement rejoins the South Australian Liberal Party, but a minority do not rejoin and form the New LM.
1977: The Australia Party and New LM join with dissident members of the Liberal Party of Australia, to form the Australian Democrats.

Australian Democrats offshoots

1992: Janet Powell forms the Janet Powell Independents' Network. Dissolved in 1993.
2003: Meg Lees forms the Australian Progressive Alliance. Dissolved in 2005.

From Country Party and Liberal Party of Australia dissidents to Country Liberal Party
1974: The NT branches of the Country Party and the Country Liberal Party secede from their parent parties and merge to form the Country Liberal Party.
1979: The Country Liberal Party affiliates with the National Country Party and the Liberal Party of Australia.

Liberal Democratic Party
2013: David Leyonhjelm of the Liberal Democratic Party (LDP), a libertarian party founded in 2001, is elected to the senate after receiving 9.51% of the primary vote in the state of New South Wales.

Liberal leaders
Protectionist, Fusion: Alfred Deakin
Fusion/Liberal Party: Joseph Cook
Liberal Party of Australia: Robert Menzies - Harold Holt - John Gorton - William McMahon - Billy Snedden - Malcolm Fraser - Andrew Peacock - John Hewson - Alexander Downer - John Howard - Brendan Nelson - Malcolm Turnbull - Tony Abbott - Malcolm Turnbull - Scott Morrison - Peter Dutton
Australian Democrats: Don Chipp - Janine Haines - Cheryl Kernot - Meg Lees - Natasha Stott Despoja - Andrew Bartlett - Lyn Allison

See also
 Christian politics in Australia 
 Conservatism in Australia
 History of Australia
 List of political parties in Australia
Moderates (Liberal Party of Australia)
 Politics of Australia
 Reason Party
 Socialism in Australia

References

External links
Libertarian Society of Australia
ABC Radio National's Hindsight - An attitude of mind and faith: liberalism in Australian political history
ABC Radio National's Lingua Franca - George Megalogenis on the words 'liberal' and 'conservative'

 
Australia
Political movements in Australia